39 Arietis (abbreviated 39 Ari), officially named Lilii Borea , is a star in the northern constellation of Aries. It is visible to the naked eye with an apparent visual magnitude of +4.5.

Nomenclature 
39 Arietis is the star's Flamsteed designation.

This star was described as Lilii Borea by Nicolas-Louis de Lacaille in 1757, 
as a star of the now-defunct constellation of Lilium (the Lily). The words are simply the Latin phrase Līliī Boreā 'in the north of Lilium'. Līliī Austrīnā  'in the south of Lilium' was 41 Arietis.

In 2016, the International Astronomical Union organized a Working Group on Star Names (WGSN) to catalog and standardize proper names for stars. The WGSN approved the name Lilii Borea for this star on 5 September 2017 and it is now so included in the List of IAU-approved Star Names.

Properties 

39 Arietis is a giant star with a stellar classification of K1.5 III. It is currently at an evolutionary stage known as the red clump, indicating that it is generating energy through the fusion of helium at its core. It has 1.6 times the mass of the Sun, but its outer envelope has expanded to around 11 times the Sun's radius. It shines with 56 times the luminosity of the Sun. This energy is being radiated into outer space from its outer atmosphere at an effective temperature of 4,603 K, giving it the cool orange-hued glow of a K-type star.

See also 
 Aries (Chinese astronomy)

References

External links 
Aladin previewer
Aladin sky atlas
 HR 824

 

K-type giants
Horizontal-branch stars
High-proper-motion stars
Aries (constellation)
BD+28 0462
Arietis, 39
017361
013061
0824